WAMI 880 AM, is a radio station formerly broadcasting a Gospel music format. Licensed to Opp, Alabama, United States, the station was once owned by The Opp Broadcasting Co., Inc. and featured programming from ABC Radio. The station is currently off the air according to Radio-Locator.com. In June 2016, a license transfer was initiated to transfer ownership from Opp Broadcasting Company, Inc., to Christopher W. Johnson, which was consummated on March 10, 2017. (According to the Alabama Broadcast Media Page)

The station, which has been silent for years, won a construction permit to move up 20 kHz to 880 kHz, with 1,000 watts during the daytime only.  If built, the current station owners plan to apply for a translator to go along with the station.  Taken from Alabama Broadcast Media Page.

A license to cover was filed for that facility in early October, 2016. (880 AM) (Taken from Alabama Broadcast Media Page)

The station was reported off air starting on 10 March 2017, coincident with the transfer to new ownership. (Taken from Alabama Broadcast Media Page)

References

External links

Gospel radio stations in the United States
AMI (AM)
Radio stations established in 1953
1953 establishments in Alabama